Bishop Perkins (September 5, 1787 in Becket, Massachusetts – November 20, 1866 in Ogdensburg, New York) was an American lawyer and politician who served one term as a United States representative from New York from 1853 to 1855.

Biography 
He graduated from Williams College in 1807. He studied law, and was admitted to the bar in 1812, commencing practice in Lisbon, New York. He subsequently moved to Ogdensburg, New York and continued the practice of law. He was clerk of the board of supervisors of St. Lawrence County from 1820 to 1852, and was appointed district attorney of St. Lawrence County on February 24, 1821, and served until May 21, 1840.

Political career 
Perkins was a member of the State constitutional convention in 1846 and a member of the New York State Assembly in 1846, 1847, and again in 1849.

Congress 
He was elected as a Democrat to the Thirty-third Congress, serving from March 4, 1853 – March 3, 1855.

He was not a candidate for renomination in 1854.

Later career and death 
After leaving office, he returned to Ogdensburg, where he continued the practice of law until his death there in 1866, aged 79; interment was in Ogdensburg Cemetery.

References

External links

1787 births
1866 deaths
People from Becket, Massachusetts
New York (state) lawyers
Williams College alumni
St. Lawrence County district attorneys
People from Lisbon, New York
Democratic Party members of the United States House of Representatives from New York (state)
Democratic Party members of the New York State Assembly
Burials in New York (state)
People from Ogdensburg, New York
19th-century American politicians
19th-century American lawyers